The Hidden Enforcers (Chinese: 殺手狂龍) is a 2002 Hong Kong action film directed by Nam Yin and starring Sammo Hung.

Plot
After a botched drug raid 15 years ago, retired police officer King (Sammo Hung) is now the head of a vigilante group hunting down criminals that killed his fellow officers.

Cast
Sammo Hung as King a retired vigilante cop
Nadia Chan as King's vigilante assistant

References

External links
 
 

2002 action films
2002 films
Hong Kong action films
2000s Hong Kong films